The Queen's Cup was an annual football cup competition in Thailand, run by the Football Association of Thailand. The competition was named after Queen Sirikit.

It was first contested in 1970, with Bangkok Bank and Royal Thai Air Force joint winners.  The last competition was held in 2010.

Championship history

See also 
 Thai football records and statistics

External links 
Thailand Queen's Cup statistics RSSSF
Thai football Blog

 
Football cup competitions in Thailand
Recurring sporting events established in 1970
1970 establishments in Thailand
Recurring sporting events disestablished in 2010
2010 disestablishments in Thailand